Gay bathhouses in the United Kingdom are referred to as "gay saunas", as opposed to gay bathhouses, the term more commonly used in North America. There are gay saunas throughout the UK in most major cities, including eight in London.

Gay saunas

Current 
Gay saunas in the UK:

 Acqua Sauna, Blackpool, Lancashire
 Basement Complex, Manchester
 ClubZeus Sauna Mansfield, Nottinghamshire
 Covent Garden Health Spa (formerly The Stable and Saunabar), London
 Dolphin Sauna, New Brighton, Merseyside
 E15 Club, Stratford, London
 Gentry Spa, Kingston upon Hull, East Yorkshire
 Heat Sauna, Stockport, Greater Manchester
 Helsinki Health Spa, Ipswich, Suffolk
 Heroes Health Club, Stourbridge, West Midlands
 Lads Locker Room, Bristol
 Legs 800 Club, Walthamstow, London
 Lindum Sauna, Bradford, West Yorkshire
 Manticore Spa, Plymouth, Devon
 Marco's Health Spa, Kingston upon Hull, East Yorkshire
 ME1 Sauna, Rochester, Kent
 Northwich Sauna, Northwich, Cheshire
 Number 52, Newcastle upon Tyne
 Outside Sauna, Belfast
 Pennine Sauna, Oldham, Greater Manchester
 Plastic Ivy Sauna, Dewsbury, West Yorkshire
 Pleasuredrome, London
 Portsea Sauna, London
 Sailors Sauna (formerly Chariots), Limehouse, London
 Splash Spa & Leisure, Leicester
 Steam Complex, Armley, Leeds
 Steamworks Sauna (formerly The Pound), Edinburgh
 Sweat, Carlisle
 Sweatbox Sauna, London
 The Boiler Room Sauna, Brighton
 The Boiler Room, Sheffield
 The Brighton Sauna, Brighton
 The Greenhouse, Luton, Bedfordshire
 The Greenhouse, Darlaston, West Midlands
 The Greenhouse, Newport, Gwent
 The Locker Room, Kennington, London
 The Pipeworks, Glasgow
 Touch Sauna, Swindon, Wiltshire
 Tropics Day Spa, Portsmouth
 W3 Sauna, Blackpool (formerly WetWetWet), Lancashire

Closed 
Former (now closed) gay saunas in the UK:

 Base Sauna (H2O), Manchester
 Base, Newcastle
 Base, Leeds
 Bright 'N' Beautiful Sauna, Brighton
 Celts Sauna, Leicester
 Chariots Farringdon, London
 Chariots Shoreditch, London
 Chariots Streatham, London
 Chariots Vauxhall, London
 Chariots Waterloo, London
 Club 69, Kingston upon Hull, East Yorkshire
 Club Kudos, Dundee
 CS2, Nottingham
 Eagle 50, Cardiff
 Gator Sauna, Exeter, Devon
 Jack's Hydro, Bangor
 Men's Micro Sauna (formerly Sauna 61 / Alpha Sauna), Maidstone, Kent
 Number 18, Edinburgh
 Pink Broadway, Southampton, Hampshire
 Spartan, Erdington, Birmingham
 Splash Sauna, Liverpool, Merseyside
 Star Steam, Battersea, London
 Steamworks, New Cross, London
 Suite.429, Chelmsford, Essex
 The Bathhouse (formerly The Suite), Bath
 The Frat House, Sheffield
 The Greenhouse, Barnsley
 The Lane, Glasgow
 The Pound, Edinburgh
 Unit 1 Sauna, Rottingdean, East Sussex
 Unit 2 Sauna, Birmingham
 Wellman's Health Studio, Aberdeen
 Wolf Spa, Nottingham

Chariots
Chariots Leisure Ltd at one point operated six gay saunas in London; as of 2020, all are closed, with another open under a different name. These venues were: 
 Chariots Shoreditch (opened 1996, closed 2016)
 Chariots Farringdon (opened 1999, closed 2010 due to the Crossrail development).
 Chariots Streatham (opened 1999, closed 2016)
 Chariots Limehouse (2002, previously Sailors Sauna, since c.2013 Sailors Sauna again)
 Chariots Waterloo (opened 2003, previously Wellingtons Health Club, closed 2018) 
 Chariots Vauxhall (2005, closed March 2020). In January 2021 Chariots Spa announced that it had gone into liquidation and that Chariots Vauxhall  was permanently closed.

In terms of floor-space and capacity, Chariots Shoreditch was the largest gay sauna in the UK.

Description
Chariots Shoreditch was on three floors, decorated in the style of Roman baths.

On the ground floor was the main entrance with several areas of customer lockers, main shower room, TV lounge with bar/cafe, vending machines, internet area and an inclusive gym with several work-out machines.

The first floor housed a maze of free private cabins of various sizes including orgy rooms and an extensive dark maze (pitch black orgy room and set of cabins).

The second floor had a swimming pool, poolside loungers, two whirlpools (jacuzzis), two steam-rooms, two hot dry saunas, showers, glory-hole cubicles, a second smaller dark room, outside private smoking area and a porn video/orgy room.

There were free STD testing sessions held at the bathhouse.

Chariots Roman Spa opened in 1997. The management previously ran Rio's, a Kentish Town naturist spa. Originally a warehouse, the Shoreditch redevelopment cost £2.5 million. In 2000 the venue was significantly expanded with the addition of the restaurant, 30 more cubicles, video lounge and internet room. It was announced in February 2016 that the venue would be closing down, and the building would be demolished for a redevelopment of the site.

Chariots Waterloo was on one level on the first floor of the building. It comprised an entrance lobby, locker room, cafe, showers, a steam room, a large sauna later divided in two, dark rooms, glory holes, private rooms and relaxation area.

Etiquette
Customers were given two towels, a locker key and condoms on entrance. Further condoms were available from wall dispensers. Most people kept the second towel as a dry spare in their locker. The convention was to walk around the bathhouse wearing a towel, though nudity in the dry or steam sauna was normal. Apart from the lounge, cafe area, lockable cabins and within the jacuzzi, sexual activity occurred anywhere, with anyone free to watch or attempt to join in.

Media attention
On 2 May 1998, former footballer Justin Fashanu spent the evening in Chariots Shoreditch before committing suicide nearby that night.

There was significant press interest and internet speculation in 2006 when Chariots Shoreditch was closed for Easter Weekend, after a 24-year-old man's body was found. The police investigation found that death was due to a drugs overdose but there were no suspicious circumstances.

On Sunday 20 March 2011 the London Fire Brigade were called to attend a fire which was reported to have destroyed most of the ground floor of Chariots Shoreditch. 150 patrons were evacuated, and there were no injuries.

References

United Kingdom
LGBT culture in the United Kingdom
LGBT places in the United Kingdom